The Women's freestyle 53 kg is a competition featured at the 2020 Individual Wrestling World Cup, and was held in Belgrade, Serbia on 14 and 15 December 2020.

Medalists

Results
Legend
F — Won by fall
R — Retired
WO — Won by walkover

References

External links
Official website

Women's freestyle 53 kg
2020 in women's sport wrestling